Enders State Forest is a Connecticut state forest located in the towns of Granby and Barkhamsted. The forest was established in 1970 with a  parcel of woodlands donated to the state by the children of John and Harriet Enders. A further family donation of land was made in 1981, and the state made a purchase of additional property in 2002.

Recreation
Several waterfalls known as Enders Falls form the core of the state forest and are popular with swimmers in the summer, though the state warns against the activity, and a number of injuries and deaths have been reported.

References

External links
Enders State Forest Connecticut Department of Energy and Environmental Protection

Connecticut state forests
Parks in Hartford County, Connecticut
Granby, Connecticut
Protected areas established in 1970
1970 establishments in Connecticut